The Red Spider is a 2015 Polish thriller film directed by Marcin Koszałka.

Plot 
"The Red Spider" for the film, which was inspired by the story of Karol Kot, a serial killer operating in Krakow in the 1960s, also known as the "Vampire from Krakow." Karol from Red Spider is a teenager like everyone else – young, well-built, on the verge of life. He comes from a good home, there are no problems at school, success, successes in sports, he falls in love. Everything is about being good, but it's not. The turning point in his life is when he accidentally witnesses a murder. Driven by curiosity, start following the killer. In this way, he discovers the dark side of his nature that existence was unaware.

Cast 
 Filip Pławiak as Karol Kremer
 Adam Woronowicz as Lucjan Staniak
 Julia Kijowska as Danka
 Wojciech Zieliński as Florek
 Małgorzata Foremniak as Karol's mother
 Marek Kalita as Karol's father

References

External links 
 
 
 The Red Spider on Cineuropa

2015 films
2015 thriller drama films
Polish thriller drama films
2010s Polish-language films